The Ohio College of Dental Surgery opened in 1845 in Cincinnati, Ohio, becoming the second private dental college in the world. In 1866 Lucy Hobbs Taylor graduated from this college,  making her the first woman to graduate from any dental college. The college affiliated itself with the University of Cincinnati in 1887, but it was ultimately closed in 1926.

Notable graduates 
 Calvin Case, developed Velum Obturator
 Lucy Hobbs Taylor, first woman to graduate from any dental college

References

Defunct private universities and colleges in Ohio
Educational institutions established in 1845
1845 establishments in Ohio
Educational institutions disestablished in 1926
1926 disestablishments in Ohio
Dental schools in Ohio
History of Cincinnati